Ernest Edward Winch (March 22, 1879 – January 11, 1957) was a British Columbia politician, trade unionist and socialist. He was a BC Co-operative Commonwealth Federation MLA in the British Columbia Legislative Assembly from 1933 until his death in 1957.

Born in England, Winch's father was a master bricklayer. The younger Winch apprenticed in the trade. In 1899 he went to Australia briefly and returned again in 1903 but again went back to England. In 1909, he came to Canada with his young family.

Winch began studying socialism in 1910 and joined the Social Democratic Party of Canada the next year becoming its provincial secretary by 1913. In July 1918, he became president of the Vancouver Trade and Labour Council,  he endorsed the Vancouver General Strike on 1918 and the Winnipeg General Strike of 1919.

He was an active member of various left wing parties including the Socialist Party of Canada and the Independent Labour Party. He refounded the Socialist Party of Canada (British Columbia) in 1932 and, with it, joined the new Co-operative Commonwealth Federation. In the 1933 provincial election he, his son Harold Winch, and five others became the first CCF MLAs in the legislature. In 1938, his son became party leader.

Winch was founder of The New Vista Society of Burnaby in 1943, a founder member of the Association for the Protection of Fur bearing Animals of British Columbia.

References

External links
 Ernest Edward Winch at The Canadian Encyclopedia

1879 births
1957 deaths
Canadian socialists
British Columbia Co-operative Commonwealth Federation MLAs
20th-century Canadian politicians
English emigrants to Canada
People from Harlow